Nepenthes albomarginata  is a tropical pitcher plant native to Borneo, Peninsular Malaysia, and Sumatra.

The specific epithet albomarginata, formed from the Latin words albus (white) and marginatus (margin), refers to the white band of trichomes that is characteristic of this species.

Botanical history

[[File:Nepenthes albomarginata (Bogor botanical park).jpg|thumb|Nepenthes albomarginata in the Bogor Botanical Gardens]]Nepenthes albomarginata was first collected by Thomas Lobb in 1848. It was formally described a year later by John Lindley in The Gardeners' Chronicle.

The species was introduced into cultivation in the United Kingdom in 1856.

In the 1996 book Pitcher-Plants of Borneo, N. albomarginata is given the vernacular name white-collared pitcher-plant. This name, along with all others, was dropped from the much-expanded second edition, published in 2008.

DescriptionNepenthes albomarginata is a climbing plant.

Leaves are coriaceous in texture. It has an acute apex and its base is gradually attenuate and amplexicaul. The leaves of this species are characteristic in that they completely lack a petiole. Longitudinal veins are indistinct.

Rosette and lower pitchers are bulbous in the basal third and cylindrical above. The pitcher mouth is round and rises to form a short neck at the rear. The inner portion of the peristome accounts for around 34% of its total cross-sectional surface length. A dense band of short white trichomes is present directly below the peristome, although these may be missing from pitchers that have caught termites. The glandular region covers the bulbous portion of the pitcher's inner surface. The lid or operculum is suborbicular and lacks appendages. An unbranched spur (≤ long) is inserted near the base of the lid.

Upper pitchers are similar to their lower counterparts in most respects. They are cylindrical-infundibular throughout and have a pair of ribs in place of wings.Nepenthes albomarginata has a racemose inflorescence that is usually longer in male plants. A study of 120 pollen samples taken from a herbarium specimen (J.H.Adam 2417, collected in Borneo at an altitude of ) found the mean pollen diameter to be  (SE = 0.4; CV = 6.2%).

Most parts of the plant are covered in a dense indumentum of very short, stellate white hairs. However, the underside of the lamina bears a dense covering of long hairs.

EcologyNepenthes albomarginata is a widespread species, occurring in Borneo, Peninsular Malaysia, and Sumatra. It is also found on smaller islands such as Nias and Penang.McPherson, S.R. & A. Robinson 2012. Field Guide to the Pitcher Plants of Sumatra and Java. Redfern Natural History Productions, Poole. It has an altitudinal distribution of 0–1200 m above sea level.

Its typical habitat consists of kerangas forest, but it has also been recorded from the summit vegetation of lowland peaks. It is known from peat and limestone substrates.Anderson, J.A.R. 1965. Limestone habitat in Sarawak. Proceedings of the Symposium on Ecological Research in Humid Tropics Vegetation, July 1963, Kuching, Sarawak. pp. 49–57.

CarnivoryNepenthes albomarginata is notable for specializing in termites; most of the species in the genus Nepenthes are unselective about their prey. According to botanist Marlis A. Merbach and coworkers, this specialization to a single prey taxon is unique amongst carnivorous plants.Clarke, T. 2002. Plant has taste for termites. Nature News, January 3, 2002. Merbach, M.A., D.J. Merbach, W.E. Booth, U. Maschwitz, G. Zizka & B. Fiala 2000. A unique niche in plant carnivory: Nepenthes albomarginata feeds on epigaeically mass foraging termites. Tagungsband gtö 2000 13. Jahrestagung der Deutschen Gesellschaft für Tropenökologie 1–3. March 2000 in Würzburg Lehrstuhl für Tierökologie und Tropenbiologie Universität Würzburg. p. 105.Nepenthes albomarginata has a unique morphological feature: a rim of living white trichomes directly below the peristome. The rim's hairs tend to be missing from pitchers that have caught termites. Merbach said "For several days, nothing would happen, then — after a single night — pitchers would fill with termites and their rim hairs would disappear."

Merbach investigated this phenomenon by placing fresh intact pitchers, together with pitchers with their white rims removed, near to the head of foraging columns of the termite Hospitalitermes bicolor. When the column found the pitcher, termites grazed on the rim.

While grazing, many termites (both workers and soldiers) fell into the pitchers. Once in the pitcher, they were unable to climb out. Merbach counted up to 22 individuals per minute falling into the pitchers and noted that the capture rate could easily exceed this for denser columns. After about an hour, the hairs were all gone and the pitcher was evidently no longer attractive to termites (and was filled with termites trying to escape).

It is not known how the trichomes lure termites to the plant. Merbach detected no long-range olfactory attraction during his experiments and noted that "all contacts seemed to happen by chance, with termites often missing pitchers less than 1 cm away from them."

Merbach also points out that N. albomarginata is the only plant species to offer its tissue as a bait.

Related species

In 2001, Clarke performed a cladistic analysis of the Nepenthes species of Sumatra and Peninsular Malaysia using 70 morphological characteristics of each taxon. The following is a portion of the resultant cladogram, showing "Clade 6", which is only weakly supported at 50%. The sister pair of N. angasanensis and N. mikei has 79% support.

Infraspecific taxaN. albomarginata f. sanguinea Toyoda ex Hinode-Kadan (1985) nom.nud.N. albomarginata var. rubra (Hort. ex Macfarl.) Macfarl. (1908)N. albomarginata var. tomentella (Miq.) Beck (1895)N. albomarginata var. typica Beck (1895) nom.illeg.N. albomarginata var. villosa Hook.f. (1873)

Natural hybridsN. albomarginata × N. ampullaria? N. albomarginata × N. chanianaN. albomarginata × N. clipeataN. albomarginata × N. eustachyaN. albomarginata × N. gracilisN. albomarginata × N. hirsutaN. albomarginata × N. macrovulgarisN. albomarginata × N. northiana [=N. × cincta]Masters, M.T. 1884. New garden plants. Nepenthes cincta (Mast.), n. sp.. The Gardeners' Chronicle, new series, 21(540): 576–577.N. albomarginata × N. rafflesianaLowrie, A. 1983. Sabah Nepenthes Expeditions 1982 & 1983. Carnivorous Plant Newsletter 12(4): 88–95.N. albomarginata × N. reinwardtiana [=N. × ferrugineomarginata]
? N. albomarginata × N. sanguineaShivas, R.G. 1985. Variation in Nepenthes albo-marginata. Carnivorous Plant Newsletter 14(1): 13–14.N. albomarginata × N. veitchiiN. albomarginata × N. northianaNepenthes × cincta is a rare plant and, due to the localised distribution of N. northiana, only grows at a few sites in Bau, Sarawak, usually on a substrate of limestone.

The traits of N. albomarginata are very dominant in this hybrid; the wide flared peristome of its larger parent species (N. northiana) is almost completely lost. Pitchers are narrowly infundibulate (funnel-shaped) throughout and range in colour from cream to dusky purple with red or black spots.

N. albomarginata × N. reinwardtiana

Its natural range covers the islands Borneo and Sumatra. The type specimen was collected by Shigeo Kurata in Kenukat, West Kalimantan, in 1981. Kurata described the hybrid the following year.

References

Further reading

 [Anonymous] 1877. Reports of Societies. Royal Horticultural. The Gardeners' Chronicle 8(197): 441.
 [Anonymous] 1883. Mr. A. E. Ratcliff's Nepenthes. The Gardeners' Chronicle 20(497): 18–19.
 Adam, J.H. 1997. Prey spectra of Bornean Nepenthes species (Nepenthaceae) in relation to their habitat. Pertanika Journal of Tropical Agricultural Science 20(2–3): 121–134.
 Beveridge, N.G.P., C. Rauch, P.J.A. Keßler, R.R. van Vugt & P.C. van Welzen 2013. A new way to identify living species of Nepenthes (Nepenthaceae): more data needed! Carnivorous Plant Newsletter 42(4): 122–128.
  Blondeau, G. 2001. Nepenthes albomarginata. In: Les Plantes Carnivores. De Vecchi, Paris. p. 69.
 Bonhomme, V., H. Pelloux-Prayer, E. Jousselin, Y. Forterre, J.-J. Labat & L. Gaume 2011. Slippery or sticky? Functional diversity in the trapping strategy of Nepenthes carnivorous plants. New Phytologist 191(2): 545–554. 
 
 Dixon, W.E. 1889. Nepenthes. The Gardeners' Chronicle, series 3, 6(144): 354.
 Fashing, N.J. 2010. Two novel adaptations for dispersal in the mite family Histiostomatidae (Astigmata). In: M.W. Sabelis & J. Bruin (eds.) Trends in Acarology: Proceedings of the 12th International Congress. Springer Science, Dordrecht. pp. 81–84. 
 Hernawati & P. Akhriadi 2006. A Field Guide to the Nepenthes of Sumatra. PILI-NGO Movement, Bogor.
 Hooker, J.D. 1859. XXXV. On the origin and development of the pitchers of Nepenthes, with an account of some new Bornean plants of that genus. The Transactions of the Linnean Society of London 22(4): 415–424. 
 Kato, M., M. Hotta, R. Tamin & T. Itino 1993. Inter- and intra-specific variation in prey assemblages and inhabitant communities in Nepenthes pitchers in Sumatra. Tropical Zoology 6(1): 11–25. Abstract
 Kitching, R.L. 2000. Food Webs and Container Habitats: The natural history and ecology of phytotelmata. Cambridge University Press, Cambridge.
  Kurniawati, R. 2010. Serangga yang terdapat pada kantong Nepenthes albomarginata T. Lobb ex Lindl. dan Nepenthes eustachya Miq. di Kawasan Cagar Alam Lembah Harau Kabupaten Limapuluh Kota. Thesis, Andalas University, Padang. Abstract 
 Kurup, R., A.J. Johnson, S. Sankar, A.A. Hussain, C.S. Kumar & S. Baby 2013. Fluorescent prey traps in carnivorous plants. Plant Biology 15(3): 611–615. 
 Lecoufle, M. 1990. Nepenthes albo-marginata. In: Carnivorous Plants: Care and Cultivation. Blandford, London. pp. 128–129.
 Lee, C.C. 2000. Recent Nepenthes Discoveries. [video] The 3rd Conference of the International Carnivorous Plant Society, San Francisco, USA.
  Macák, M. 1998. Portréty rostlin - Nepenthes albomarginata. Trifid 1998(3–4): 57–59. (page 2, page 3)
 Macfarlane, J.M. 1914. Family XCVI. Nepenthaceæ. [pp. 279–288] In: J.S. Gamble. Materials for a flora of the Malayan Peninsula, No. 24. Journal & Proceedings of the Asiatic Society of Bengal 75(3): 279–391.
  Mansur, M. 2001. Koleksi Nepenthes di Herbarium Bogoriense: prospeknya sebagai tanaman hias. In: Prosiding Seminar Hari Cinta Puspa dan Satwa Nasional. Lembaga Ilmu Pengetahuan Indonesia, Bogor. pp. 244–253.  
  Mansur, M. 2007. Keanekaragaman jenis Nepenthes (kantong semar) dataran rendah di Kalimantan Tengah. [Diversity of lowland Nepenthes (kantong semar) in Central Kalimantan.] Berita Biologi 8(5): 335–341. Abstract
 Mansur, M. & F.Q. Brearley 2008. Ecological studies on Nepenthes at Barito Ulu, Central Kalimantan, Indonesia. Jurnal Teknologi Lingkungan 9(3): 271–276.
 Masters, M.T. 1872. The cultivated species of Nepenthes. The Gardeners' Chronicle and Agricultural Gazette 1872(16): 540–542.
 McPherson, S.R. & A. Robinson 2012. Field Guide to the Pitcher Plants of Borneo. Redfern Natural History Productions, Poole.
 Meimberg, H., A. Wistuba, P. Dittrich & G. Heubl 2001. Molecular phylogeny of Nepenthaceae based on cladistic analysis of plastid trnK intron sequence data. Plant Biology 3(2): 164–175. 
  Meimberg, H. 2002. Molekular-systematische Untersuchungen an den Familien Nepenthaceae und Ancistrocladaceae sowie verwandter Taxa aus der Unterklasse Caryophyllidae s. l.. Ph.D. thesis, Ludwig Maximilian University of Munich, Munich. 
 Meimberg, H. & G. Heubl 2006. Introduction of a nuclear marker for phylogenetic analysis of Nepenthaceae. Plant Biology 8(6): 831–840. 
 Meimberg, H., S. Thalhammer, A. Brachmann & G. Heubl 2006. Comparative analysis of a translocated copy of the trnK intron in carnivorous family Nepenthaceae. Molecular Phylogenetics and Evolution 39(2): 478–490. 
 Merbach, M.A., G. Zizka, B. Fiala, U. Maschwitz & W.E. Booth 2001. Patterns of nectar secretion in five Nepenthes species from Brunei Darussalam, Northwest Borneo, and implications for ant-plant relationships. Flora 196: 153–160. 
 Moran, J.A., W.E. Booth & J.K. Charles 1999. Aspects of pitcher morphology and spectral characteristics of six Bornean Nepenthes pitcher plant species: Implications for prey capture. Annals of Botany 83: 521–528.
  Murniati, Syamswisna & A. Nurdini 2013. Pembuatan flash card dari hasil inventarisasi Nepenthes di hutan adat desa Teluk Bakung. Jurnal Pendidikan dan Pembelajaran 2(1): [unpaginated; 14 pp.] Abstract 
  Nurita, E. 2010. Mikrosporogenesis pada kantung semar (Nepenthes albomarginata T.Lobb ex Lindl). Thesis, Andalas University, Padang. Abstract 
 Osunkoya, O.O., S.D. Daud & F.L. Wimmer 2008. Longevity, lignin content and construction cost of the assimilatory organs of Nepenthes species. Annals of Botany 102(5): 845–853. 
 Renner, T. & C.D. Specht 2011. A sticky situation: assessing adaptations for plant carnivory in the Caryophyllales by means of stochastic character mapping. International Journal of Plant Sciences 172(7): 889–901. 
 Riedel, M., A. Eichner, H. Meimberg & R. Jetter 2007. Chemical composition of epicuticular wax crystals on the slippery zone in pitchers of five Nepenthes species and hybrids. Planta 225(6): 1517–1534. 
 Shivas, R.G. 1984. Pitcher Plants of Peninsular Malaysia & Singapore. Maruzen Asia, Kuala Lumpur.
 Smythies, B.E. 1965. The distribution and ecology of pitcher-plants (Nepenthes) in Sarawak. UNESCO Humid Tropics Symposium, June–July 1963, Kuching, Sarawak.
  Sukamto, L.A. 2005. Kultur Nepenthes albomarginata secara in vitro. In: Laporan Teknik Pusat Penelitian Biologi-LIPI. Lembaga Ilmu Pengetahuan Indonesia, Bogor. pp. 433–438.
  Syamsuardi & R. Tamin 1994. Kajian kekerabatan jenis-jenis Nepenthes di Sumatera Barat. Project report, Andalas University, Padang. Abstract 
  Syamsuardi 1995. Klasifikasi numerik kantong semar (Nepenthes) di Sumatera Barat. [Numerical classification of pitcher plants (Nepenthes) in West Sumatra.] Journal Matematika dan Pengetahuan Alam 4(1): 48–57. Abstract 
 Takeuchi, Y., M.M. Salcher, M. Ushio, R. Shimizu-Inatsugi, M.J. Kobayashi, B. Diway, C. von Mering, J. Pernthaler & K.K. Shimizu 2011. In situ enzyme activity in the dissolved and particulate fraction of the fluid from four pitcher plant species of the genus Nepenthes. PLoS ONE 6(9): e25144. 
 Thorogood, C. 2010. The Malaysian Nepenthes: Evolutionary and Taxonomic Perspectives. Nova Science Publishers, New York.
 Wan, A.S., R.T. Aexel, R.B. Ramsey & H.J. Nicholas 1972. Nepenthaceae: sterols and triterpenes of the pitcher plant. Phytochemistry'' 11(1): 456–461.

External links

Photographs of N. albomarginata  at the Carnivorous Plant Photofinder
Nepenthes albo-marginata of Penang Hill

Carnivorous plants of Asia
albomarginata
Flora of Borneo
Flora of Peninsular Malaysia
Flora of Sumatra
Conservation dependent plants